Heterochyta xenomorpha is a moth in the family Xyloryctidae. It was described by Edward Meyrick in 1906. It is found in Australia, where it has been recorded from Western Australia.

The wingspan is about 19 mm. The forewings are fuscous very finely sprinkled with whitish points, with a very few scattered black specks. The stigmata are small and blackish, with the plical obliquely before the first discal, the second discal transversely double. The hindwings are light fuscous.

References

Heterochyta
Moths described in 1906
Taxa named by Edward Meyrick